Bernard Grech (born 8 June 1971) is a Maltese politician and lawyer who has been the leader of the Nationalist Party since 2020.

Early and professional life 
Grech was born on 8 June 1971, in Paola to John and Frida Grech. He grew up in Birżebbuġa and he graduated as a lawyer, focusing on civil law. Grech practiced his professional activity in two law firms, specializing in the mediation of family disputes.

Involvement in politics 

In 2011, Grech took part in the campaign, which was later lost, against the legalization of divorce in Malta. Not officially involved until then in active roles in politics, he got closer to the positions of the Maltese Nationalist Party in 2018. In August 2020 he stood against the leader Adrian Delia, after the party congress voted to hold a new leadership contest.

Grech became the leader of the Nationalist Party on 3 October 2020, winning the election against incumbent Adrian Delia with 69.3% of the votes. He was sworn in as Leader of the Opposition on 7 October.

Personal life
Grech declares himself a practicing Catholic; he also expressed opinions against the legalization of abortion. In his private life he cultivates a personal interest in opera.

Grech is married to AnneMarie. They have 2 children together, a son and a daughter, and reside in Mosta.

Grech's father John died on 18 September 2022 at the age of 90, while his mother, Frida, died in January 2023.

References 

1971 births
Living people
People from Paola, Malta
University of Malta alumni
20th-century Maltese lawyers
21st-century Maltese politicians
Nationalist Party (Malta) politicians
Leaders of the Opposition (Malta)
21st-century Maltese lawyers